Bigg Boss OTT Kannada 1 ,also known as Bigg Boss: Over-The-Top Kannada , is the first season of the Indian Kannada-language reality digital series Bigg Boss Kannada, the first to be released exclusively on OTT platform Voot and Voot Select. It premiered on 6 August 2021 on Viacom18's streaming service Voot and premium streaming service Voot Select with Sudeep as the host. The OTT season concluded on 16 September 2022. Roopesh, Rakesh, Sanya, Aaryavardhan emerged as Champions of the season and got ticket to Bigg Boss Kannada 9. Roopesh Shetty emerged as the top performer of the season .

Production 

TeaserOn 22 July 2022, Voot un eviled a poster with Sudeep as the host of digital exclusive season. On 23 July, Voot unevlied a promo with Sudeep hosting a first season of Bigg Boss OTT Kannada.

BroadcastApart from usual hour-long episode, viewers will also have access to the direct 24x7 camera footage. The episodes will be telecasted through 24 Hours Live Channel and episodes will premiere on 7pm for paid subscription of Voot Select, the it will be shown for free next morning at 9 am on Voot.

House The house consists of a Patio, Living Room, Kitchen, Bathroom, Bedroom, Garden Area, Confession Room, Dining Table, Swimming Pool.

Bigg Boss Kannada 9As per the show's concept, Champions Saniya Iyer, Aaryavardhan Guruji, Rakesh Adiga and Top performer Roopesh Shetty were qualified to participate in Bigg Boss Kannada 9. Iyer was evicted on Day 42 and Guruji on Day 93. Later Adiga and Shetty made it into finale  of Bigg Boss Kannada 9 by living in for 14 weeks, covering more hardship journey than OTT .Shetty and Adiga emerged as Winner and 1st Runner-up of Season 9 respectively.

Housemate Status

Housemates 
Aryavardhan Guruji:- Popular astrologer, numerologist and often makes his appearance on television in special shows related to astrology and numerology. He is one of the rarest astrologers who get trolled often.
Sonu Srinivas Gowda:- A digital media sensation.
Sanya Iyer:- Sanya shot to fame as a child artist with the mega show Puttagowri Maduve, where she essayed the character of Junior Gowri.
Somanna Machimada:- a news reporter by profession, shot to fame with his special celebrity interviews. He has been a media person for a long time now. His journey to a successful reporter and a news presenter is worth a mention.
Spoorthi Gowda:- Last seen on Kannada television with daily soap Seetha Vallaba, Spoorthi has been in the industry for a long time now. She has also been a part of the Telugu television industry.
Arjun Ramesh:- The actor, who is set to make his silver screen debut, is close to the telly viewers as 'Lord Shiva'. Arjun essayed the role of Lord Shiva in the mythological series Mahakaali. He even acted in supernatural fiction Naagini.
Roopesh Shetty:- This multi-talented youngster has acted in Kannada, Tulu, and Konkani movies. The Radio Jockey and model is from Mangalore.
Akshatha Kuki:- This young talent from Dandeli is indeed known for her chirpy nature. She has also been a model in her career and aspires to become a full-fledged actress.
Rakesh Adiga:- A passionate actor and rapper, Rakesh got his first break with his debut Kannada film Jhhosh in the year 2009. The film went on to become one of the top grossers of that year and earned him good recognition. Ever since then, he has featured in quite some Kannada movies.
Chaitra Halikere:- Chaitra was recently in the news when she lodged an FIR against her husband and father-in-law. The actress shot to fame with her debut movie 'Kushi'. However, she was away from the limelight for a long time and made her small screen comeback with the daily soap Marali Manasaagide.
Kiran Yogeshwar:- A model, dancer, travel, enthusiast, and yoga instructor, Kiran is quite a bundle of talent. Hailing from Rajasthan, Kiran's journey to becoming a successful independent woman is worth a mention.
Jayashree Aradhaya:- She is proud independent entrepreneur. Not many know that Jayashree Aradhya is the granddaughter of late actress Marimuthu from Upendra's movie ‘A’.
Lokesh:- Comedy Khiladigalu fame Lokesh is not new to Kannada viewers. The actor-comedian steals the show every time he makes an appearance. After Comedy Khiladigalu, Lokesh went on to feature in quite some reality shows.
Jashwanth and Nandu :- After winning the Hindi TV reality show Roadies, Jashwanth and Nandu are now set to enter Bigg Boss Kannada OTT. The too-much-in-love couple is looking forward to building their identity in their homeland.
 Uday Surya:- Television actor

Nominations Table

References

External links 

 Bigg Boss OTT Kannada on Voot

Bigg Boss Kannada
2022 Indian television seasons